Crown International Pictures (CIP) was an independent film studio and distribution company formed in 1959 by Newton P. Jacobs.

History
Jacobs was a branch head of RKO Pictures until 1947, when he formed Favorite Films, an organization which released films acquired from the studios which had originally produced them, long after their first run release. CIP became one of the first franchise distributors for American International Pictures (AIP) product.  Like AIP, Crown International is primarily known for low-budget genre films, including; grindhouse cinema, biker films, exploitation films, and B-movie drive-in fare.

Crown International began releasing both low-budget films  as Bloodlust! and The Seventh Commandment, by American producers, as well as foreign films such as First Spaceship on Venus and Varan the Unbelievable (released as a double feature in 1962) which Crown was able to acquire inexpensively, due to the US dollar's strength.  Crown began producing its own films, starting with Coleman Francis' The Skydivers, in 1963.

Beginning in 1961, Crown began by releasing six films, with the number rising to 12 a decade years later. Jacobs felt that Crown survived by having carefully planned growth and not overextending its product. He said that Crown did not want to be regarded as a mini major studio but as the top of the independents, to give the company more freedom in selecting and exploiting its film library. Well over 50% of exhibitors showing Crown's products were drive-in theatres, with the number decreasing to 30% in 1981.

Crown often re-titled its releases to make them sound more exciting or exploit current trends.  Jacobs told the Los Angeles Times in November 1963, "A title is the handle  . . . You can't lift a picture very high if the handle is weak"

Crown also acted as importer for Sonny Chiba's Street Fighter films to the United States.

In 1973, Mark Tenser, who had been vice-president, became president with Jacobs' ascension to become chairman of the board. Jacobs' daughter Marilyn Jacobs Tenser became vice president. The company handled its in-house production division, Marimark Productions, to produce a majority of the Crown's later output.

The director of Death Machines (1976) gave an account of how Crown picked up and shot new scenes for his film that included shooting a prologue that would make the martial arts film a science-fiction one to make it more in line with current box-office trends.

In 1983, Crown International Pictures launched a new international division Crown International Pictures Export Corporation, whereas it took over duties from previous firm distributor who had once got a contract from Crown, Manson International, in order to market sales of Crown's own pictures internationally. In 1987, Crown International Pictures, signed a three-title deal with RCA/Columbia Pictures Home Video, which resulted in RCA/Columbia picking up home video rights to Crown's in-house production Hunk, as well as acquisitions handled by Crown, which are Scorpion and Jocks, of which all three Crown films will be headed to home video this summer.

In July 1988, Jacobs died in a motorcycle accident, which resulted in his son, Louis, taking the helm of Crown International.

Filmography

Home media
In 1964 Crown packaged several of the features that it released or had acquired rights to become part of a package of the Westhampton Film Corp. American television production company Desilu entered film syndication in 1964 by acquiring the rights to show Crown International films as part of the "Westhampton Feature Package". In the 1970s Crown released films for syndication through Gold Key Entertainment, which was a division of Vidtronics, Inc.

Many of Crown's releases have been released to DVD on BCI Home Entertainment's Welcome to the Grindhouse, Starlite Drive-In Theater and Drive-In Cult Classics series. Several Crown films have been shown on Mystery Science Theater 3000. Since Navarre Corporation's closing of its subsidiary BCI Home Entertainment, DVD distribution of Crown's library has transferred to Mill Creek Entertainment. Most of the television rights to Crown's library are today owned by Lionsgate via their 2005 acquisition of Modern Entertainment.

References

External links
Crown International Pictures website

Film distributors of the United States
Entertainment companies based in California
Companies based in Beverly Hills, California
Entertainment companies established in 1959
1959 establishments in California
American companies established in 1959
American companies disestablished in 1992
American independent film studios